Swimming was contested at the 1994 Asian Games in Hiroshima Big Wave Pool, Hiroshima, Japan from October 3 to October 8, 1994.

Medalists

Men

Women

Medal table

References 

 New Straits Times, October 3–9, 1994
 Results

External links 
 Olympic Council of Asia

 
1994 Asian Games events
1994
Asian Games
1994 Asian Games